Victor Pițurcă (born 8 May 1956) is a Romanian professional football manager and former player.

Club career
Pițurcă was born in Orodel, Dolj County. He joined Universitatea Craiova as a youth in 1970, aged 14, and four years later he was loaned to Dinamo Slatina, a club from Romania's Liga II, in order to gain more experience, before being called back to Craiova in 1975, making his debut for the team in November that year.

As he was not used much by Universitatea, Pițurcă left the club in 1977 to join Pandurii Târgu Jiu and then FC Drobeta Turnu-Severin, from where he was signed by FC Olt, thus returning to play in Liga I.

In 1983, he was requested by Steaua, helping the club to reach its highest peak in European football.

Pițurcă won with Steaua the European Cup in 1986, the European Super Cup in 1987, and was the semi-finalist in the same competition losing to Benfica in 1988. During the 1988–89 season the team reached the European Cup final again, but lost to Milan. As for domestic performances, Pițurcă won the championship with Steaua București five times and the Romanian Cup four times.

At the end of the 1987–88 season he was the top scorer of Liga I and won UEFA's Bronze Boot.

A very funny moment happened in 1989 during the European Cup semi-final played by Steaua against Galatasaray in İzmir when the Turkish side's goalkeeper relieved the ball hitting Pițurcă's back and from there the ball went straight into the goal. However, the goal was not validated because the referee did not see what happened.

On 25 March 2008, he was awarded the Ordinul "Meritul Sportiv" medal — (The Order "The Merit for Sports Achievement") class II by the president of Romania, Traian Băsescu for his part in winning the 1986 European Cup Final.

International career
Despite being a prolific striker, Pițurcă only won 13 caps for Romania, scoring six times.

Coaching career
After playing for Racing Club de Lens during the 1989–90 season, Pițurcă called it a day and retired from professional football to take over as coach. His first appointment was with Steaua București in 1991, followed by another one with Universitatea Craiova in 1994, finishing second in the championship at the end of 1994–95 season.

In 1996, he was named coach of the Romania Under 21 side, leading the team to its best performances ever, including a qualification to the Under 21 European Championship in 1998, hosted by Romania.

In 1998, he was appointed as Romania's manager and qualified the team to the 2000 European Football Championship. However, despite finishing the qualification group undefetead, Pițurcă was sacked before even taking his squad to the Euro 2000. The reason was an argument he had had with Romania's best players, Gheorghe Hagi and Gheorghe Popescu, both managed by Ioan Becali. Becali was Pițurcă's worst enemy because Pițurcă did not want to promote the players he managed to the national team, but he was great friends with Romanian Football Federation president Mircea Sandu.

In December 1999 he took over as manager of Steaua București, winning the championship in 2001, but resigned in 2004 after an argument with the club's chairman, Gigi Becali, who wanted to sack a player whom Pițurcă wanted to keep on the team.

In December 2004 he was appointed manager of Romania for the second time. At first Romania did well under his coaching, defeating several important European teams both in friendlies (Germany, Spain) and official matches (Czech Republic in Group 1 of the 2006 FIFA World Cup Qualification and the Netherlands in Group G of the UEFA 2008 Qualifying Round).

After topping their qualifying group (and thus qualifying for their first international tournament in 8 years), Romania was drawn in Group C at UEFA Euro 2008, alongside the Netherlands, Italy and France. At the time of the draw, these countries' respective Elo rankings among European teams were 1st, 2nd, 4th and 8th, and as such the group has been dubbed the competition's "group of death". After drawing their first two games against the finalists of the previous World Cup (0–0 against France, 1–1 against Italy), Romania lost 0–2 to the Netherlands, finishing the group in third place and thus being eliminated from the competition.

After Euro 2008, Romania showed an increasingly poor form in both friendly games and the 2010 World Cup qualifying campaign, where they had a slow start. In their first two official games after Euro 2008, Romania lost 0–3 against Lithuania at home and four days later secured a difficult 1–0 victory against the Faeroe Islands. Although many of the players which helped Romania qualify for the Euro 2008 missed these two matches, this was not accepted as a reasonable excuse for the extremely poor results by the Romanian media and public opinion. The next official match, against France, was considered decisive for Romania's qualification chances. Despite managing only a 2–2 tie, the team's performance was generally deemed satisfactory, and Pițurcă was offered one last chance to remain coach of the national team: to win both of the next two games in the qualifying group, against Serbia and Austria, within a four-day timespan. Romania eventually lost both matches (3–2 on 28 March 2009 against Serbia at home, 2–1 on 1 April against Austria away).

Considering Romania's extremely poor performances in 2008 and 2009, the Romanian Football Federation released Victor Pițurcă from his job from the Romania national team on 9 April 2009. A few weeks later, Răzvan Lucescu was appointed as his successor.

In 2010, he had two short spells as manager at FCSB and Universitatea Craiova.

On 14 June 2011, he returned for a third spell in charge of the Romania national team.

On 16 October 2014, he left the Romania national team to sign a two-year deal with Al-Ittihad in Saudi Arabia. In January 2015, he was heavily criticized for excluding Al-Ittihad's top stars Mohammed Noor and Hamad Al-Montashari due to disobeying training procedure. As of today, Noor has missed over 10 league matches, which was considered by Saudi journalists "way too far" for a punishment considering he is Al-Ittihad's longest tenured and most accomplished player. On 4 April 2015 before the decisive match between Al-Ittihad and Al-Nassr, Pițurcă was seen shaking hands with Noor. On 10 May 2015, after four months, Noor and Al-Montashari returned.

Finally at the end of the season, Piturca's contract with Al-Ittihad was dismissed after a disappointing season, as he couldn't succeed to keep the team on the top three teams of the Saudi Premier league table. In addition, he failed to pass the semi-final round in the Saudi King's Cup.

On 22 August 2019, he signed a contract with his youth club Universitatea Craiova for 3 years. He resigned in January 2020.

Personal life
At Steaua București and FC U Craiova he coached his son, Alexandru who was a striker. He is the cousin of Eugen Neagoe.

He was nicknamed Satana ("Satan") by the press, something he called "remarkable".

Honours

Player
Steaua București
Divizia A (5): 1984–85, 1985–86, 1986–87, 1987–88, 1988–89
Cupa României: 1984–85, 1986–87, 1987–88, 1988–89
European Cup: 1985–86; Runner-up: 1988–89
European Supercup: 1986

Individual
Divizia A top scorer: 1987–88 (34 goals)
European Bronze Boot: 1987–88

Manager
Steaua București
Divizia A: 2000–01
Cupa României: 1991–92
Supercupa României: 2001

Managerial statistics

References

External links

Profile at SteauaFC.com 

1956 births
Living people
Romanian footballers
Association football forwards
People from Dolj County
CS Universitatea Craiova players
CS Pandurii Târgu Jiu players
FC Drobeta-Turnu Severin players
FC Olt Scornicești players
FC Steaua București players
RC Lens players
Romania international footballers
Romanian football managers
Liga I managers
UEFA Euro 2008 managers
Saudi Professional League managers
FC Steaua București assistant managers
FC Steaua București managers
FC U Craiova 1948 managers
Romania national football team managers
Ittihad FC managers
CS Universitatea Craiova managers
Expatriate football managers in Saudi Arabia
Romanian expatriate sportspeople in Saudi Arabia